Sennavaram is a village in the Tiruvallur district of Tamil Nadu, India. It is located in the Gummidipoondi taluk.

This village is located 1 km from Pattupalli, 4 km from Sunnambukulam and 0.5 km from Rakkampalayam. It is located close to the Rakkampalayam lake.

Demographics 

According to the 2011 census of India, Sennavaram has 124 households. The effective literacy rate (i.e. the literacy rate of population excluding children aged 6 and below) is 60.12%.

References 

Villages in Gummidipoondi taluk